The ringed antpipit (Corythopis torquatus) is a species of bird in the family Tyrannidae, the tyrant flycatchers. It is one of two species in the genus Corythopis.
It is found in the Amazon Basin of Brazil and the Guianas, and Amazonian Colombia, Ecuador, Peru, and Bolivia; also Guyana, Suriname, French Guiana, and in eastern Venezuela in the Orinoco River drainage.

Its natural habitat is subtropical or tropical moist lowland forests.

It is named 'ringed' for its tawny-colored back-collar patch on its upper back, side-neck and upper shoulders, and is a small bird, medium-brownish to darkish gray, with a white breast with large vertical black streakings. It has dark black patches on its upper breast areas, and has a short tail.

Range

The range of the ringed antpipit is the entire Amazon Basin, the Guianan region, Marajó Island, and the southeast Orinoco River Basin region in eastern Venezuela; also the downstream half of the neighboring Amazon Basin river system in the southeast, the Araguaia-Tocantins River, with the range ending easterly on the Atlantic coast of Brazil's Maranhão state.

In the southern Amazon Basin approaching the northwestern Cerrado it approaches the range of its sister Corythopis species, southern antpipit, but the ranges do not intersect.

References

External links
Ringed antpipit photo gallery VIREO
Photo-High Res; Article bolivianbeauty–(South American birds)

ringed antpipit
Birds of the Amazon Basin
Birds of the Guianas
ringed antpipit
Birds of Brazil
Taxonomy articles created by Polbot